Gran Hermano is the Argentine version of the international reality television franchise Big Brother produced by Endemol. The show is currently hosted by Santiago del Moro, taking over after Jorge Rial and previously Soledad Silveyra. The show first aired on 10 March 2001 on Telefe and aired seven regular and one Celebrity season until 16 April 2012. It was on hiatus for three years until 29 April 2015, when a revival of the series began airing on América TV for two seasons until 24 August 2016. After a six-year break, the show returned to Telefe for its tenth season that premiered on 17 October 2022.

The show features contestants called "HouseGuests" who live together in a specially constructed house that is isolated from the outside world, and the housemates are continuously monitored during their stay in the house by live television cameras as well as personal audio microphones. Throughout the course of the competition, they are voted out (usually on a weekly basis) until only one remains and wins the cash prize.

History 
The series was acquired by Telefe in early 2001. The Argentine version of the series officially premiered on 10 March 2001, when the original twelve housemates entered the house. Until its fourth season, the show was hosted by actress Soledad Silveyra, when she was later replaced by Jorge Rial. Rial left the show during season seven, when Mariano Peluffo took over for the reminder of the season. Rial later returned as host for the eighth season when the series moved to América TV. After the return to Telefe for its tenth season, Santiago del Moro was confirmed as the new host. Currently, 10 seasons of the show have aired, along with one Celebrity season. Season 10 premiered on 17 October 2022. The show has aired a total of over 250 episodes since it premiered, and there have been a total of 200 HouseGuests competing in the series. Upon entering the house, the HouseGuests must abide by the house rules; HouseGuests can anytime leave the house without permission or be forcibly removed from the game if they broke any rules, such as exhibiting violent and disruptive behavior. In both cases, these HouseGuests are not allowed to return to the house.

Series overview

Episodes

HouseGuests

Seasons

Season 1 (2001)
The first season of the reality television series Gran Hermano premiered on 10 March 2001 on Telefe in Argentina, and ended on 30 June 2001 after 120 days of competition. Soledad Silveyra was the host for the season. On the season finale, Marcelo Corazza was crowned the winner defeating runner-up Tamara Paganini with 83.56 percent of the votes by the public, earning a prize of 121,200 Argentine pesos.

HouseGuests

Voting history
HouseGuests nominated for two and one points, shown in descending order in the nomination box. The two or more HouseGuests with the most nomination points faced the public vote.

Notes

Season 2 (2001)
The second season of the reality television series Gran Hermano premiered on 4 August 2001 on Telefe in Argentina, and ended on 1 December 2001 after 120 days of competition. Soledad Silveyra returned as host. Roberto Parra was crowned the winner defeating runner-up Silvina Luna with 47.14 percent of the votes by the public, earning a prize of 200,000 Argentine pesos.

HouseGuests

Voting history
HouseGuests nominated for two and one points, shown in descending order in the nomination box. The two or more HouseGuests with the most nomination points faced the public vote.

Notes

Repechage
After Pablo Heredia decided to leave, Gran Hermano decided that during the debate show after the seventh eviction gala, a repechage would be made for a former participant to return to the house. During the show, by decision of the public, Silvina Luna re-entered the house.

Season 3 (2002–03)
The third season of the reality television series Gran Hermano premiered on 15 October 2002 on Telefe in Argentina, and ended on 16 February 2003 after 125 days of competition. Soledad Silveyra returned as host for the last time. Vivana Colmenero was crowned the winner defeating runner-up Mauricio Córdoba with 46.87 percent of the votes by the public, earning a prize of 100,000 Argentine pesos.

Eduardo Carrera was exchanged with Inmaculada González from the fourth season of Gran Hermano Spain for one week.

HouseGuests

Voting history
On this season, HouseGuests had three votes for nomination until week 12, the first vote for two points and the remaining two for one point, shown in descending order in the nomination box. After week 12 the nominations returned to the original format, with HouseGuests nominating for two and one points. The two or more HouseGuests with the most nomination points faced the public vote.

Notes

Repechage
After Sebastián Spur decided to leave, Gran Hermano decided that during the third nomination gala, a repechage would be made for a former participant to return to the house. During the show, by decision of the public, Natalia Quintilliano re-entered the house.

Season 4 (2007)
The fourth season of the reality television series Gran Hermano premiered on 9 January 2007 on Telefe in Argentina, and ended on 7 May 2007 after 119 days of competition. Jorge Rial was confirmed as the new host. Marianela Mirra was crowned the winner defeating Juan Expósito and Mariela Montero Ríos with 41.46 percent of the votes by the public, earning a prize of 100,000 Argentine pesos.

Pablo Espósito was exchanged with Íris Stefanelli from the seventh season of Big Brother Brasil for six days.

HouseGuests

Voting history
On this season, the first person to go to the Diary Room to nominate has the option to allocate 3 points and 2 points to their nominees. This is called the "Special Nomination" and must be used before nominations start. All other HouseGuests can assign 2 points and 1 point to their nominees. The first HouseGuest listed received the most points and the second housemate listed received the fewest points.

The HouseGuest that used the Diary Room's Special Nomination is marked in orange.

Notes

Repechage
During week 9, Gran Hermano decided to realize a repechage to give a former HouseGuest the opportunity to re-enter the house, with the option to decide whether to realize it or not to the current HouseGuests. The voting resulted with 6 votes in favor of the repechage (Gabriel, Jessica, Jonathan, Juan, Marianela and Sebastián) and 3 against it (Diego, Griselda and Mariela). The current HouseGuests voted to decide who would re-enter the house, and with 15 votes Claudia Ciardone finally re-entered the house with the ban on nominating for the first two weeks since her return.

Gran Hermano Famosos (2007)
The Celebrity season of the reality television series Gran Hermano premiered on 13 May 2007 on Telefe in Argentina, and ended on 1 August 2007 after 81 days of competition, becoming the shortest season to date. Jorge Rial returned as host. Diego Leonardi was crowned the winner defeating runner-up Jacqueline Dutrá with 82 percent of the votes by the public, earning a prize of 66,666 Argentine pesos.

HouseGuests

Voting history
HouseGuests nominated for two and one points, shown in descending order in the nomination box. The two or more HouseGuests with the most nomination points faced the public vote. The "Special Nomination" in which a HouseGuest nominates with the option to allocate 3 points and 2 points to their nominees continued to be used during this season.

The HouseGuest that used the Diary Room's Special Nomination is marked in orange.

Notes

Season 5 (2007)
Start Date: 8 August 2007 - 2 December 2007 (Days: 116)

Housemates

Nominations Table
In this series, the first person to go to the diary room to nominate has the option to allocate 3 points and 2 points to their nominees. This is called the "Special Nomination" and must be used before nominations start. All other housemates can assign 2 points and 1 point to their nominees. The first housemate listed received the most points and the second housemate listed received the fewest points.
 The Housemate that used the Diary Room's Special Power is marked in orange.

Notes

Season 6 (2010–11)

Season 7 (2011–12)

Season 8 (2015)

Season 9 (2016)

Season 10 (2022–23)

The tenth season of the Argentine version of the television reality show Gran Hermano was announced on 21 June 2022 by Telefe. After last airing on América TV in 2016, the show made its return to the original network Telefe, and it would be the first series to air in the network since the seventh season that aired during 2011–2012.

Santiago del Moro was formally announced as the show's new host. The show follows a group of contestants (known as HouseGuests), who live in a house together while being constantly filmed and having no communication with the outside world as they compete to win a grand prize of ARS15 million and a house. The runner-up also wins a house. Each week, the HouseGuests compete in a Head of Household (HoH) competition which gives them immunity from nominations and the power to save one of the nominees up for eviction. 
On eviction night, the audience votes to evict one of the nominees.

The season premiered on 17 October 2022, and is expected to run for 153 days, with the season ending on 19 March 2023.

References

External links 
Official site

 
2001 Argentine television series debuts
Argentine reality television series